WPHP (91.9 FM) is a high school radio station broadcasting a Contemporary Hit Radio music format. Licensed to Wheeling, West Virginia, United States, it serves the greater Wheeling area.  The station is currently owned by the Ohio County Board Of Education and is operated by the students of Wheeling Park High School.

External links
 The All New 92 Online
 
 
 

PHP
High school radio stations in the United States
Ohio County, West Virginia
Contemporary hit radio stations in the United States